César Julio Romero Jr. (February 15, 1907 – January 1, 1994) was an American actor and activist. He was active in film, radio, and television for almost sixty years.

His wide range of screen roles included Latin lovers, historical figures in costume dramas, characters in light domestic comedies, and the Joker on the Batman television series, which was included in TV Guides 2013 list of The 60 Nastiest Villains of All Time. He was the first actor to play the character.

Early life

César Julio Romero Jr. was born in New York City on February 15, 1907, the son of César Julio Romero Sr. (1872–1951) and María Mantilla (1880–1962). His mother was said to be the biological daughter of Cuban national hero José Martí. His father was born in Barcelona and immigrated to the United States in 1888, where he was an import/export merchant. His mother was a concert singer.

Romero grew up in Bradley Beach, New Jersey, and went to Bradley Beach Elementary School, Asbury Park High School, the Collegiate School, and the Riverdale Country Day School. After his parents lost their sugar-import business and suffered losses in the Wall Street crash of 1929, Romero's Hollywood earnings allowed him to support his large family, all of whom followed him to the American West Coast years later. Romero, who referred to himself as "a Latin from Manhattan", lived on and off with various family members for the rest of his life.

On October 12, 1942, he enlisted in the United States Coast Guard as an apprentice seaman and served in the Pacific Theater of Operations. He reported aboard the Coast Guard-crewed assault transport  in November 1943. According to a press release from the period, Romero saw action during the invasions of Tinian and Saipan. The same article mentioned that he preferred to be a regular part of the crew and was eventually promoted to the rating of chief boatswain's mate.

Career in film

The 6'3" [190 cm] Romero routinely played "Latin lovers" in films from the 1930s until the 1950s, usually in supporting roles.  In 1935, Romero played a leading role The Devil is a Woman opposite Marlene Dietrich. Romero starred as the Cisco Kid in six westerns made between 1939 and 1941. Romero danced and performed comedy in the 20th Century Fox films he starred in opposite Carmen Miranda and Betty Grable, such as Week-End in Havana and Springtime in the Rockies, in the 1940s. He also played a minor role as Sinjin, a piano player in Glenn Miller's band, in the 1942 20th Century Fox musical Orchestra Wives.

In The Thin Man (1934), Romero played a villainous supporting role opposite the film's main stars William Powell and Myrna Loy. Many of Romero's films from this early period saw him cast in small character parts, such as Italian gangsters and East Indian princes. Romero had a lead role as the Pathan rebel leader, Khoda Khan, in John Ford's British Raj-era action film Wee Willie Winkie (1937) starring Shirley Temple and Victor McLaglen and The Little Princess (1939) also with Temple. He also appeared in a comic turn as a foil for Frank Sinatra and his crew in Ocean's 11 (1960) starring the Rat Pack (Sinatra, Dean Martin, Sammy Davis Jr., Peter Lawford and Joey Bishop).

Romero sometimes played the leading man, for example in Allan Dwan's 15 Maiden Lane (1936) opposite Claire Trevor, as well as winning the key role of the Doc Holliday character (with name changed to "Doc Halliday") in Dwan's acclaimed Wyatt Earp saga Frontier Marshal (1939) starring Randolph Scott and Nancy Kelly three years later. 20th Century Fox, along with mogul Darryl Zanuck, selected Romero to co-star with Tyrone Power in the Technicolor historical epic Captain from Castile (1947), directed by Henry King. While Power played a fictionalized character, Romero played Hernán Cortés, a historical conquistador in Spain's conquest of the Americas.

Among almost countless television credits, Romero appeared several times on The Martha Raye Show in the mid-1950s. He portrayed Don Diego de la Vega's maternal uncle in a number of Season 2 Zorro episodes.

In 1958, he guest-starred as Ramon Valdez in How to Marry a Millionaire in the episode entitled "The Big Order". He performed the mambo with Gisele MacKenzie on her NBC variety show, The Gisele MacKenzie Show. He guest-starred in 1957 on CBS's The Lucy–Desi Comedy Hour on the first episode of the seventh season ("Lucy Takes a Cruise to Havana"). He played "Don Carlos", a Card sharp on the episode, "The Honorable Don Charlie Story" of NBC's Wagon Train. On January 16, 1958, he appeared on The Ford Show, Starring Tennessee Ernie Ford. In 1959, Romero was cast as Joaquin in the episode "Caballero" from The Texan, and on September 26 of that year, he hosted the Cuban installment of John Gunther's High Road.

In 1960, he was cast as Ricky Valenti in "Crime of Passion" from Pete and Gladys. In 1965, Romero played the head of THRUSH in France in "The Never Never Affair" from The Man from U.N.C.L.E.

From 1966 to 1968, he portrayed the Joker on Batman. He refused to shave his moustache for the role, and so the supervillain's white face makeup was simply smeared over it throughout the series' run and in the 1966 film.

His guest star work in the 1970s included a recurring role on the western comedy Alias Smith and Jones as Señor Armendariz, a Mexican rancher feuding with Patrick McCreedy (Burl Ives), the owner of a ranch on the opposite side of the border. He appeared in three episodes. Romero later portrayed Peter Stavros on Falcon Crest (from 1985 to 1987). He also appeared in a sixth-season episode of The Golden Girls, where he played a suitor named Tony Delvecchio for Sophia. Apart from these television roles, Romero appeared as A.J. Arno, a small-time criminal who continually opposes Dexter Riley (played by Kurt Russell) and his schoolmates of Medfield College in a series of films by Walt Disney Productions in the 1970s.

Political activities
A registered Republican, Romero appeared in the Nixon-Lodge bumper sticker motorcade campaign in October 1960, and four years later, initially supported Henry Cabot Lodge, Jr. in the write-in campaign supporting Lodge for president. Romero appreciated and said he liked Lodge's strong anti-Communist stance in South Vietnam where Lodge was at the time the United States ambassador. Later that year, Romero supported Barry Goldwater in the general election.

Also in 1964, Romero was very much involved in the U.S. Senate race in California that pitted one of Romero's best friends and fellow actor, Republican nominee George Murphy (who nicknamed Romero "Butch"), in his bid to oust then-Senator Pierre Salinger, a Democrat.

The Senate race was a heated contest where Salinger had already narrowly defeated then-California State Controller Alan Cranston, who would become a senator in 1968, in the Democratic primary. Both men had "primaried" Senator Clair Engle, who had sought re-nomination despite being terminally ill with a brain tumor; Engle died less than two months after the primary. Then-Democratic Governor Pat Brown appointed Salinger instead of Cranston to fill the vacancy; although the appointment seemed reasonable since Salinger had won the primary, it was roundly criticized by Romero and Murphy as cronyism since Salinger had been the White House press secretary for the late President John F. Kennedy, a close ally of Brown. Romero appealed to disappointed Cranston backers after the primary to support Murphy. Romero's urging helped Salinger lose a race no one thought could be lost.

Murphy lost the full use of his voice during his term when part of his larynx was removed due to throat cancer. Romero employed other Hollywood stars to try to help Murphy win re-election in 1970. However, Murphy lost re-election to John V. Tunney, the son of boxing legend Gene Tunney.

After Murphy's Senate defeat, Romero scaled back his involvement in politics but would take part for a Hollywood friend, such as Ronald Reagan in his successful gubernatorial bids in 1966 and 1970 as well as all four of his presidential bids in 1968, 1976, 1980, and 1984. Romero also joined with fellow actors and actresses in lobbying the United States Congress to present the then-dying John Wayne with a Congressional Gold Medal for his service to the nation.

Personal life
Romero never married and had no children, but made frequent appearances at Hollywood events escorting actresses, such as Joan Crawford, Linda Darnell, Barbara Stanwyck, Lucille Ball, Ann Sheridan, Jane Wyman and Ginger Rogers; he was almost always described in interviews and articles as a "confirmed bachelor".
Many Hollywood historians and biographers have speculated on Romero being closeted about his sexuality.  Author Boze Hadleigh included a series of claimed interviews with Romero in Hadleigh's 1996 book Hollywood Gays in which Romero allegedly came out; many of the claimed interviews in Hollywood Gays have come into dispute as possible forgeries, and Romero died two years before the book was released.

Charlie Harper, lead singer of English punk band UK Subs, is reportedly a nephew of Romero.

Death
On January 1, 1994, at age 86, Romero died from complications of a blood clot while being treated for bronchitis and pneumonia at Saint John's Health Center in Santa Monica, California.

His body was cremated and the ashes were interred at Inglewood Park Cemetery, Inglewood, California.

For his contributions to the motion picture and television industry, Romero has a star on the Hollywood Walk of Fame at 6615 Hollywood Boulevard for film and another star at
1719 Vine Street for television.

Filmography

Film

Television

Theatre

Radio appearances

References

External links

 
 
 
 
 Cesar Romero profile, Virtual-History.com; accessed April 17, 2017. 
 Cesar Romero interview in "Jean Boone - Interview with Cast of Batman, The Movie (1966)" at Texas Archive of the Moving Image
 
 Romero Family Papers Regarding José Martí dloc.com (Digital Library of the Caribbean); accessed April 17, 2017.

1907 births
1994 deaths
Male actors from New York (state)
American male film actors
United States Coast Guard personnel of World War II
American people of Cuban descent
American people of Spanish descent
American male television actors
Burials at Inglewood Park Cemetery
Deaths from pneumonia in California
Hispanic and Latino American male actors
People from Bradley Beach, New Jersey
Male actors from New York City
Asbury Park High School alumni
Collegiate School (New York) alumni
United States Coast Guard non-commissioned officers
California Republicans
New York (state) Republicans
20th-century American male actors
20th Century Studios contract players
Riverdale Country School alumni
Deaths from bronchitis